The following is a list of mayors of the city of Vitória, in the state of Espírito Santo, Brazil.

 Ceciliano Abel de Almeida, 1909
 José Bernardino Alves Júnior, 1909-1910
 Carlos Xavier Paes Barreto, 1910
 Antônio Francisco de Atayde, 1910
 Cassiano Cardoso Castello, 1910-1911
 Waldemiro Fradesco da Silveira, 1911-1913
 Washington T. Vasconcelos Pessoa, 1913, 1914-1916
 Euclides Camargo, 1913-1914, 1920
 Henrique de Novaes, 1916-1920
 José de Souza Monteiro, 1920
 Antonio Pereira Lima, 1920-1924
 Otávio Indio do Brasil Peixoto, 1924-1928
 Moacyr Monteiro Avidos, 1928-1930
 , 1930-1933
 Laerte Rangel Brígido, 1933
 Augusto Seabra Muniz, 1933-1935
 Álvaro Sarlo, 1935-1936
 Paulino Muller, 1936-1937
 Américo Poli Monjardim, 1937-1944, 1946-1947
 Henrique de Novaes, 1945
 Danton Bastos, 1945-1946
 Nelson Goulart Monteiro, 1946
 Cecialiano Abel de Almeida, 1947-1948
 Álvaro de Castro Matos, 1948-1951
 José Ribeiro Martins, 1951-1953
 Armando Duarte Rabelo, 1953-1955
 Serynes Pereira Franco, 1955
 Adelpho Poli Monjardim, 1955-1957, 1959-1963
 Mário Gurgel, 1957-1958
 Oswaldo Cruz Guimarães, 1958-1959
 Danglar Ferreira da Costa, 1962-1963
 Solon Borges Marques, 1963-1966
 Jair Andrade, 1966-1967
 Setembrino I. Netto Pelissari, 1967-1970, 1975
 Silvio Marques, 1967
 Jair Cruz do Nascimento, 1970
 Décio da Silva Thevenard, 1970-1971
 Luiz Carlos Peixoto, 1971
 Edmar Machado, 1972-1973
 Lúcio Toscano Aragon, 1975
 Chrisógono Teixeira da Cruz, 1971-1975
 Carlos Moacyr Monjardim, 1978
 Wander José Bassini, 1978-1979
 Wlamir Coelho da Silva, 1979, 1983
 Carlos A. Lindenberg Von Schilgen, 1979-1982
 Wallace Vieira Borges, 1982
 Rudy Maurer, 1982-1983
 Vitor de Souza Martins, 1983
 Ferdinand Berredo de Menezes, 1983-1984
 Moacyr Cypreste, 1984
 Ferdinand Berredo de Menezes, 1984-1985
 Estanislau Kostka Stein, 1985
 José Moraes, 1985
 Hermes L. Laranja Gonçalves, 1986-1988
 Edson Rodrigues Batista, 1986
 José Roberto Zanoni, 1987-1988
 , 1989-1992
 Paulo César Hartung Gomes, 1993-1996
 , 1997-2004
 , 2005-2012
 , 2012-

See also
  (city council)
 
 
 List of mayors of largest cities in Brazil (in Portuguese)
 List of mayors of capitals of Brazil (in Portuguese)

References

This article incorporates information from the Portuguese Wikipedia.

Vitoria